Guézon is a town in western Ivory Coast. It is a sub-prefecture of the Facobly Department in Guémon Region, Montagnes District.

Guézon was a commune until March 2012, when it was abolished with 1126 other communes nationwide.

In 2014, the population of Guézon was 8,674.

Villages
The six villages of Guézon and their populations in 2014 are:
 Douédy (1,707)
 Gbézio (1,015)
 Guézon (2,304)
 Kloplou (1,352)
 Séambly (1,246)
 Soakpé (1,050)

Notes

Sub-prefectures of Guémon
Former communes of Ivory Coast